The Chester Road North Ground, often referred to simply as Chester Road or Kidderminster, is a cricket ground in Kidderminster, Worcestershire, England. It is the home of Kidderminster Cricket Club, and is currently used for Worcestershire County Cricket Club's Second XI matches. It was opened in 1870.

International cricket
Kidderminster hosted international cricket in 2005 when the second Women's One-day International between England and Australia was played here. The Australians won by 65 runs thanks largely to 7-24 from Shelley Nitschke, who became the first Australian woman to take more than five wickets in an ODI.

First-class and List A cricket
Worcestershire played one County Championship match at Kidderminster every season from 1921 until 1973, and again each year from 1987 to 2002. Chester Road was then relegated to a Second-XI ground, and the only first-class game at Kidderminster for several years was Worcestershire's 2005 game against Loughborough UCCE, which the university side won by eight wickets. In 2007, with New Road badly affected by flooding, Kidderminster hosted two Championship games, while in 2008 Loughborough UCCE again visited. First-class cricket returned to Kidderminster in June 2019 when Worcestershire transferred their game against Sussex to the ground because of the threat of flooding at New Road.

In List A cricket, one Player's County League game was held here in 1969, and a further six List A matches — three involving the Worcestershire team proper and three more contested by the recreational Worcestershire Cricket Board team — were hosted between 2000 and 2002. A further Pro40 game was played there in 2007, as were two Twenty20 matches. In 2010, the ground hosted the Unicorns team in the Pro40 competition.

Records

First-class
 Highest team total: 560 by Worcestershire v Derbyshire, 1993
 Lowest team total: 63 by Worcestershire v Northamptonshire, 1963
 Highest individual innings: 259 by Don Kenyon for Worcestershire v Yorkshire, 1956
 Best bowling in an innings: 9-56 by Jack Flavell for Worcestershire v Middlesex, 1964

List A
 Highest team total: 281/7 (40 overs) by Worcestershire v Northamptonshire, 2007
 Lowest team total: 56 (27.1 overs) by Middlesex v Worcestershire, 1969
 Highest individual innings: 100 by Moeen Ali for Worcestershire v Northamptonshire, 2007
 Best bowling in an innings: 5-36 by Imran Jamshed for Worcestershire Cricket Board v Dorset, 2002

Notes

References
 Chester Road North Ground, Kidderminster from CricketArchive. Retrieved 19 December 2006.

Cricket grounds in Worcestershire
Kidderminster
Sports venues completed in 1870